Keft Gol Anbar (also Romanized as Keft Gol Ānbār) is a village in Dasht-e Lali Rural District, in the Central District of Lali County, Khuzestan Province, Iran. At the 2006 census, its population was 33, in 5 families.

References 

Populated places in Lali County